Endless Love (literal translation Dark Love) is a Turkish drama series produced by Ay Yapım and broadcast on Star TV between 2015 and 2017. It is directed by Hilal Saral and stars Turkish actors Burak Özçivit, Neslihan Atagül and Kaan Urgancıoğlu.

The series has become a milestone in the international history of Turkish series, being awarded by the International Emmy Awards for best telenovela in 2017, becoming the first and only Turkish series to win this award. In addition, it has also been the only Turkish series to become a finalist in these awards.

Similarly, Kara Sevda received the special jury award at the Seoul International Drama Awards in Korea, where the director Hilal Saral and Burak Özçivit, one of the leading actors, traveled to collect the award.

Four years after the end of Kara Sevda, the series was awarded as "The Best International Soap Opera" in the Soap Awards France 2021. Burak Özçivit and Neslihan Atagül were the only Turkish actors nominated for "Best International Actor" and "Best International Actress" respectively.

According to Can Okan, founder and CEO of Inter Medya, the international distributor of the series, "words are useless when talking about the success of Kara Sevda". The novel has become the most watched Turkish series in the world, being broadcast in more than 110 countries with successful audiences and has been translated into more than 50 languages. Some countries where it has been broadcast are Turkey, Russia, Greece, Hungary, Morocco, France, Serbia, Romania, Germany, Iraq, Slovakia, Ukraine, Albania, Spain, Iran, Mexico, Bolivia, Panama, Uruguay, Ecuador, Slovenia, South Africa, Paraguay, Uzbekistan and the Philippines among others.

In its broadcast in the United States through Univision, it became the most watched foreign soap opera in the entire history of the country and the Turkish series with the highest audience, surpassing its main competitors. The love story remains the most watched fiction in Hispanic prime time with more than 2 million viewers every day and close to 4 million in its final episode, something that no other series has achieved. Currently, Kara Sevda remains the most watched Turkish series in the United States.

Such has been the overwhelming success of the series that in the Wax Museum of "Tashkent City Park" in Uzbekistan, two figures of Kemal and Nihan are exhibited, the main characters of the series, in the part dedicated to Istanbul.

Kara Sevda's YouTube channel accumulates almost 3 billion views, being one of the most viewed Turkish series on this platform.

Plot 
Kemal Soydere is the son of a middle-class family; Nihan is the daughter of wealthy socialites Önder and Vildan Sezin, and also has a twin brother Ozan whom she loves dearly. Önder's business is slowly falling apart, and unable to give up her luxurious life, her mother Vildan pushes Nihan to marry Emir Kozgoulu, who's infatuated with her. But Nihan is appalled at the idea as she despises Emir, perceiving him as ruthless and arrogant.

In his last year in mining engineering, Kemal meets Nihan when her helps her buy a bus ticket. The pair fall hopelessly in love at first sight and Nihan completely changes Kemal's monotonous life. Despite the class difference between them, they manage to be together. That is, until Emir stages an accident that results in Ozan killing a girl. To prevent Ozan from going to jail, Nihan agrees to marry Emir. The next day, she goes to meet Kemal at the port where he proposes to her; between tears, Nihan sadly turns down his marriage proposal and ends their relationship. Heartbroken, Kemal leaves Istanbul and goes to Zongak to work in the mines. He isolates himself in his work and one day, following his actions to help in an accident at the mine, Kemal is promoted and assumes a position of power in the company. Five years later, Kemal makes the decision to return to Istanbul to face his past.

Cast and characters

Production 
Kara Sevda has been shot entirely in the city of Istanbul, Turkey, with the exception of the mine explosion scene from the first episode, which was shot in Zonguldak. Some of the places where the series was filmed are:

 Üsküdar: Here is the neighborhood where Kemal Soydere's parents Fehime and Hüseyin Soydere live.
 Beşiktaş: In one of its neighborhoods, is where Leyla lives.
 Yeniköy: In this village, Nihan Sezin lives with her parents and also with Emir Kozcuoglu.
 Acibadem Universities: Part of this university became "Kozcuoglu Holding", the company of Emir and his father.

Awards and nominations

References

External links 
  

2015 Turkish television series debuts
Turkish drama television series
International Emmy Award for Best Telenovela
Television series produced in Istanbul
Television shows set in Istanbul
Television series set in the 2010s